Thotakura Somaraju and Saluri Koteswara Rao, popularly known as Raj–Koti were Indian film music composers, singer-songwriters, record producers, musicians and multi-instrumentalists duo in Telugu cinema, In a notable career spanning a decade, the duo has garnered particular acclaim for redefining contemporary Telugu film music. They composed music for about 180 films. Out of their 3000 songs, about 2,500 songs were sung by singers S. P. Balasubrahmanyam and K. S. Chithra.

The Raj–Koti duo was among the many prominent South Indian composers for whom A. R. Rahman has worked as a keyboard programmer for 8 years.  
In a television interview aired on ABN Andhrajyothy, the duo announced that they are teaming up again in 2012 and reinstate the Raj–Koti brand.

Background
Thotakura Somaraju (Raj) is the son of T. V. Raju and Saluri Koteswara Rao (Koti) is the son of S. Rajeswara Rao.

Awards
Nandi Awards
Nandi Award for Best Music Director – 1994 – Hello Brother

Filmography
Raj–Koti

Raj's Solo career filmography
Sisindri (1995)
Bharatha Simham (1995)
Ramudochadu (1996)
Mrugam (1996)
Bobbili Bullodu (1996) 
Sambhavam (1998)
Premante Idera (1998) 
Chinni Chinni Aasa (1999) 
Suryaputrika
Lagna Patrika (2002)

References

Indian musical duos
Telugu film score composers
Kannada film score composers